Giulio Alessandrini (Latin Julius Alexandrinus or German Julius Alexandrinus von Neustein; 1506 – 25 August 1590) was an Italian physician, author, and poet.

Biography 

Giulio Alessandrini was born in Trento.  He studied philosophy at the University of Padua. He was physician to emperors Ferdinand I, Maximilian II, and Rudolph II.

He was a devoted follower of Galen and translated many of Galen's works into Latin, adding his own commentary.  He died in Civezzano.

Works
 De medicina et medico dialogus. Zurich, 1557.
 In Galeni præcipua scripta, annotationes quæ commentariorum loco esse possunt. Accessit Trita illa de theriaca quaestio. Basel, 1581.
 Pædotrophia carmine (1559).
 Paedotrophia sive de puerorum educatione. Liber ab auctore recognitus. Ejusdem carmina alia. Trent, 1586.
 Salubrium, sive de sanitate tuenda, libri triginta tres. Cologne, 1575 — A treatise on hygiene compiled from ancient authors.

References
 
 
this article incorporates material from the French Wikipedia article

People from Trento
16th-century Italian physicians
Italian medical writers
1506 births
1590 deaths